The World Chess Championship 1972 was a match for the World Chess Championship between challenger Bobby Fischer of the United States and defending champion Boris Spassky of the Soviet Union. The match took place in the Laugardalshöll arena in Reykjavík, Iceland, and has been dubbed the Match of the Century. Fischer became the first American born in the United States to win the world title, and the second American overall (Wilhelm Steinitz, the first world champion, became a naturalized American citizen in 1888). Fischer's win also ended, for a short time, 24 years of Soviet domination of the World Championship. 

The first game was played on July 11, 1972. The last game (the 21st) began on August 31, was  after 40 moves, and Spassky resigned the next day without resuming play. Fischer won the match 12½–8½, becoming the eleventh undisputed world champion.

Background
The match was played during the Cold War, although during a period of increasing détente. The Soviet Chess School had a 24-year monopoly on the world championship title, with Spassky the latest in an uninterrupted chain of Soviet world chess champions, stretching back to the 1948 championship.

Fischer, an eccentric 29-year-old American, claimed that Soviet players gained an unfair advantage by agreeing to short draws among themselves in tournaments. In 1962, the American magazine Sports Illustrated and the German magazine Der Spiegel published Fischer's article "The Russians Have Fixed World Chess", in which he expounded this view. Fischer himself rarely agreed to early draws.

Spassky faced enormous political pressure to win the match. While Fischer was often famously critical of his home country ("Americans want to plunk in front of a TV and don't want to open a book ..."), he too carried a burden of expectation because of the match's political significance. No American had achieved the world championship since the first champion, Wilhelm Steinitz, became a naturalized American citizen in 1888. The unusual public interest and excitement surrounding the match was so great that it was called the "Match of the Century", even though the same term had been applied to the USSR vs. Rest of the World match just two years before.

Spassky, the champion, had qualified for world championship matches in 1966 and 1969. He lost the world championship match to Tigran Petrosian in 1966. In the 1969 cycle, he won matches against Efim Geller, Bent Larsen, and Viktor Korchnoi to win the right to challenge a second time, then defeated Petrosian 12½–10½ to win the world title. He is often said to have had a "universal style", "involving an ability to play the most varied types of positions", but Garry Kasparov notes that "from childhood he clearly had a leaning toward sharp, attacking play, and possessed a splendid feel for the initiative." 

In the Candidates matches en route to becoming the challenger in 1972, Fischer had demolished world-class grandmasters Mark Taimanov and Bent Larsen, each by a perfect score of 6–0, a feat no one else had ever accomplished in any Candidates match. In the Candidates final against Petrosian, Fischer won the first game, lost the second, drew the next three, then finished with four consecutive wins to win the match 6½–2½. "No bare statement conveys the magnitude and impact of these results. ... Fischer sowed devastation." From the last seven rounds of the Interzonal until the first game against Petrosian, Fischer won 19 consecutive games (plus 1 win on forfeit), nearly all of which were against top grandmasters.

Fischer also had a much higher Elo rating than Spassky. On the July 1972 FIDE rating list, Fischer's 2785 was a record 125 points ahead of the number two player – Spassky, whose rating was 2660. Fischer's recent results and record Elo rating made him the pre-match favorite. Other observers, however, noted that Fischer had never won a game against Spassky. Before the match, Fischer had played five games against Spassky, drawing two and losing three.

Spassky's  for the match were Efim Geller, Nikolai Krogius and Iivo Nei. Fischer's was William Lombardy. His entourage also included lawyer Paul Marshall, who played a significant role in the events surrounding the match, and USCF representative Fred Cramer. The match referee was Lothar Schmid.

For some time, it appeared that the match might not be played at all. Shortly before the match, Fischer demanded that the players receive, in addition to the agreed-upon prize fund of $125,000 (5/8 to the winner, 3/8 to the loser) and 30% of the proceeds from television and film rights, 30% of the box-office receipts. He failed to arrive in Iceland for the opening ceremony on July 1. Fischer's erratic behavior was seemingly full of contradictions, as it had been throughout his career. He finally flew to Iceland and agreed to play after a two-day postponement of the match by FIDE President Max Euwe, a surprise doubling of the prize fund by British investment banker Jim Slater, and much persuasion, including a phone call from US National Security Advisor Henry Kissinger. Many commentators, particularly from the USSR, have suggested that all this (and his continuing exorbitant demands and unreasonable attitude) was part of Fischer's plan to "psych out" Spassky. Fischer's supporters say that winning the World Championship was the mission of his life, that he simply wanted the setting to be perfect for it when he took the stage, and that his behavior was the same as it had always been.

World-class match play (i.e., a series of games between the same two opponents) often involves one or both players preparing one or two openings very deeply, and playing them repeatedly during the match. Preparation for such a match also involves analysis of lines known to be played by the opponent. Fischer had been famous for his unusually narrow opening repertoire: for example, almost invariably playing 1.e4 as White, and almost always playing the Najdorf Variation of the Sicilian Defense as Black against 1.e4. He surprised Spassky by repeatedly switching openings, and by playing openings that he had never, or only rarely, played before (such as 1.c4 as White, and Alekhine's Defense, the Pirc Defense, and the Paulsen Sicilian as Black). Even in openings that Fischer had played before in the match, he continually deviated from the variations he had previously played, almost never repeating the same line.

1970 Interzonal tournament
The Interzonal tournament was held in Palma de Mallorca, Spain, in November and December 1970. The top six players of the interzonal (shown in bold in the table below) qualified for the Candidates matches. Bobby Fischer had not qualified to play in this event, as he had not participated in the 1969 US Championship (Zonal). However, Pal Benko (and the reserve William Lombardy) gave up his spot, and FIDE President Max Euwe controversially allowed Fischer to participate instead. A compensation of USD $1,500 was paid to Benko for this to occur.

{| class="wikitable"
|+ 1970 Interzonal Tournament
|-
!  !! !! 1 !! 2 !! 3 !! 4 !! 5 !! 6 !! 7 !! 8 !! 9 !! 10 !! 11 !! 12 !! 13 !! 14 !! 15 !! 16 !! 17 !! 18 !! 19 !! 20 !! 21 !! 22 !! 23 !! 24 !! Total !! Tiebreak
|- style="background:#ccffcc;"
| 1 || align=left| || - || 0 || 1 || ½ || 1 || 1 || ½ || 1 || ½ || 1 || 1 || 1 || 1 || 1 || 1 || 1 || 1 || ½ || 1 || 1 || ½ || ½ || 1 || ½ || 18½ || 
|- style="background:#ccffcc;"
| 2 || align=left| || 1 || - || ½ || ½ || 0 || 1 || ½ || ½ || ½ || ½ || 1 || 1 || 0 || ½ || ½ || 1 || ½ || 1 || ½ || 1 || 1 || ½ || 1 || ½ || 15 || 167.50
|- style="background:#ccffcc;"
| 3 ||  || 0 || ½ || - || 1 || ½ || 1 || ½ || 1 || ½ || ½ || ½ || 1 || ½ || ½ || 1 || ½ || 1 || ½ || ½ || ½ || 1 || 1 || ½ || ½ || 15 || 167.00
|- style="background:#ccffcc;"
| 4 || align=left| || ½ || ½ || 0 || - || ½ || 1 || ½ || 0 || ½ || ½ || 0 || ½ || ½ || 1 || ½ || 1 || 1 || 1 || 1 || ½ || 1 || 1 || 1 || 1 || 15 || 155.25
|- style="background:#ccffcc;"
| 5 || align=left| || 0 || 1 || ½ || ½ || - || ½ || ½ || ½ || ½ || ½ || ½ || 0 || ½ || 0 || 1 || 1 || ½ || 1 || ½ || 1 || ½ || 1 || 1 || 1 || 14 || 146.50
|- style="background:#ccffcc;"
| 6 || align=left| || 0 || 0 || 0 || 0 || ½ || - || 1 || ½ || ½ || 1 || ½ || ½ || 1 || ½ || 0 || 1 || ½ || 1 || 1 || ½ || 1 || 1 || 1 || 1 || 14 || 141.50
|-
| 7 || align=left| || ½ || ½ || ½ || ½ || ½ || 0 || - || ½ || 0 || 1 || ½ || 1 || 1 || ½ || ½ || ½ || 1 || ½ || ½ || 1 || ½ || 1 || 1 || 0 || 13½ || 149.75
|-
| 8 || align=left| || 0 || ½ || 0 || 1 || ½ || ½ || ½ || - || 1 || ½ || ½ || 0 || ½ || ½ || ½ || ½ || ½ || ½ || 1 || 1 || ½ || 1 || 1 || 1 || 13½ || 141.00
|-
| 9 || align=left| || ½ || ½ || ½ || ½ || ½ || ½ || 1 || 0 || - || ½ || 1 || ½ || ½ || ½ || ½ || 1 || 0 || ½ || 1 || 1 || ½ || ½ || ½ || ½ || 13 || 146.75
|-
| 10 || align=left| || 0 || ½ || ½ || ½ || ½ || 0 || 0 || ½ || ½ || - || 1 || ½ || 1 || ½ || 1 || ½ || ½ || 1 || 0 || ½ || 1 || ½ || 1 || 1 || 13 || 135.50
|-
| 11 || align=left| || 0 || 0 || ½ || 1 || ½ || ½ || ½ || ½ || 0 || 0 || - || ½ || ½ || ½ || 1 || 1 || ½ || ½ || ½ || ½ || 1 || 1 || ½ || 1 || 12½ || 130.75
|-
| 12 || align=left| || 0 || 0 || 0 || ½ || 1 || ½ || 0 || 1 || ½ || ½ || ½ || - || 1 || ½ || ½ || ½ || ½ || 0 || ½ || ½ || 1 || 1 || 1 || 1 || 12½ || 130.00
|-
| 13 ||  || 0 || 1 || ½ || ½ || ½ || 0 || 0 || ½ || ½ || 0 || ½ || 0 || - || 1 || ½ || 1 || ½ || ½ || ½ || ½ || 1 || ½ || 1 || ½ || 11½ || 
|-
| 14 ||  || 0 || ½ || ½ || 0 || 1 || ½ || ½ || ½ || ½ || ½ || ½ || ½ || 0 || - || ½ || ½ || 0 || ½ || ½ || ½ || ½ || 1 || ½ || ½ || 10½ || 
|-
| 15 ||  || 0 || ½ || 0 || ½ || 0 || 1 || ½ || ½ || ½ || 0 || 0 || ½ || ½ || ½ || - || 0 || ½ || ½ || 1 || ½ || 0 || 1 || ½ || 1 || 10 || 105.75
|-
| 16 ||  || 0 || 0 || ½ || 0 || 0 || 0 || ½ || ½ || 0 || ½ || 0 || ½ || 0 || ½ || 1 || - || 1 || ½ || ½ || ½ || 1 || ½ || 1 || 1 || 10 || 96.00
|-
| 17 ||  || 0 || ½ || 0 || 0 || ½ || ½ || 0 || ½ || 1 || ½ || ½ || ½ || ½ || 1 || ½ || 0 || - || ½ || ½ || ½ || 0 || 0 || ½ || 1 || 9½ || 
|-
| 18 ||  || ½ || 0 || ½ || 0 || 0 || 0 || ½ || ½ || ½ || 0 || ½ || 1 || ½ || ½ || ½ || ½ || ½ || - || ½ || ½ || 0 || 0 || ½ || 1 || 9 || 98.50
|-
| 19 ||  || 0 || ½ || ½ || 0 || ½ || 0 || ½ || 0 || 0 || 1 || ½ || ½ || ½ || ½ || 0 || ½ || ½ || ½ || - || ½ || 0 || 0 || 1 || 1 || 9 || 95.25
|-
| 20 ||  || 0 || 0 || ½ || ½ || 0 || ½ || 0 || 0 || 0 || ½ || ½ || ½ || ½ || ½ || ½ || ½ || ½ || ½ || ½ || - || ½ || 1 || ½ || 0 || 8½ || 91.50
|-
| 21 ||  || ½ || 0 || 0 || 0 || ½ || 0 || ½ || ½ || ½ || 0 || 0 || 0 || 0 || ½ || 1 || 0 || 1 || 1 || 1 || ½ || - || 0 || 0 || 1 || 8½ || 88.75
|-
| 22 ||  || ½ || ½ || 0 || 0 || 0 || 0 || 0 || 0 || ½ || ½ || 0 || 0 || ½ || 0 || 0 || ½ || 1 || 1 || 1 || 0 || 1 || - || 1 || ½ || 8½ || 85.25
|-
| 23 ||  || 0 || 0 || ½ || 0 || 0 || 0 || 0 || 0 || ½ || 0 || ½ || 0 || 0 || ½ || ½ || 0 || ½ || ½ || 0 || ½ || 1 || 0 || - || 1 || 6 || 
|-
| 24 ||  || ½ || ½ || ½ || 0 || 0 || 0 || 1 || 0 || ½ || 0 || 0 || 0 || ½ || ½ || 0 || 0 || 0 || 0 || 0 || 1 || 0 || ½ || 0 || - || 5½ || 
|}

Portisch and Smyslov contested a six-game playoff in Portorož, Yugoslavia, in early 1971 for the reserve position for the Candidates Tournament. The match ended 3–3; Portisch was declared the winner because of a better tie-break score in the main tournament.

1971 Candidates matches
Petrosian, as the loser of the last championship match, and Korchnoi, as runner-up of the previous Candidates final, were seeded directly into the Candidates match stage, and were joined by the top six from the Interzonal. In the Petrosian–Hübner quarterfinal in Seville, Hübner withdrew from the match after a loss in the 7th game due to noise complaints.
The quarterfinals and semifinals matches were played as the best of 10 games.  The final match was the best of 12 games.

Fischer dominated the 1971 Candidates Tournament; his 6–0–0 defeats of both Mark Taimanov and Bent Larsen were, and, as of 2022 still are, unparalleled at this level of chess. His loss in game 2 of the Candidates Final versus Tigran Petrosian ended a 20-game winning streak.

Fischer's victory earned him the right to challenge reigning champion Spassky for the title.

1972 World Championship match

Schedule and results
The match was played as the best of 24 games, with wins counting 1 point and draws counting ½ point, and would end when one of the players scored 12½ points. If the match ended in a 12–12 tie, the defending champion (Spassky) would retain the title. The first time control was 40 moves in 2½ hours. Three games per week were scheduled. Each player was entitled to three postponements for medical reasons during the match. Games were scheduled to start on Sunday, Tuesday, and Thursday. If a game was adjourned, it was to be continued the next day. Saturday was a rest day.  Over the course of the match "nearly one thousand"  were played, with each player taking a turn.  In grand total, somewhat less than two thousand plies were played.

Fischer insisted that a Staunton chess set from Jaques of London be used.  The chessboard had to be remade at Fischer's request.  The match was covered throughout the world. Fischer became a worldwide celebrity, described as the Einstein of chess. His hotel received dozens of calls each day from women attracted to him, and Fischer enjoyed reading the numerous letters and telegrams that arrived, whether with compliments or criticisms. Excitement grew as the match was postponed and people questioned whether Fischer would appear.  Previously, he had come to the airport and, surrounded by reporters, left. The combination of the intrigue surrounding whether Fischer will play or not and the "American versus Russian" narrative fitting to the Cold War setting sparked excitement throughout the world.

Games

Game 1: Spassky–Fischer, 1–0 (Nimzo-Indian) 
July 11. At the beginning of play, Fischer was not present. Spassky played 1.d4 and pressed the clock, and nine minutes elapsed before Fischer arrived, shook hands with Spassky, and responded 1...Nf6. The opening was a placid Nimzo-Indian Defense, and after 17...Ba4 the game was even (Filip). After a series of piece exchanges it appeared to be a  ending, and no one would have been surprised if the players had agreed to a draw here.

Shockingly, Fischer played 29...Bxh2 as shown, a move that few players would consider in light of the obvious 30.g3, trapping the bishop. In exchange for the lost bishop, Black is only able to obtain two pawns (see chess piece relative value). Gligorić, Kasparov and other commentators have suggested that Fischer may have miscalculated, having planned 30...h5 31.Ke2 h4 32.Kf3 h3 33.Kg4 Bg1, but overlooking that 34.Kxh3 Bxf2 35.Bd2 keeps the bishop trapped. Anatoly Karpov suggested that Spassky was afraid of Fischer and wanted to show that he could draw with the white pieces, while Fischer wanted to disprove that as the game headed for a stale draw. Owing to unusual features in the position, Fischer had good drawing chances despite having only two pawns for the bishop. Fischer could still have drawn the game with the correct 39th or 40th move. He  on move 56.

Game 2: Fischer forfeits 
After his loss Fischer made further demands on the organizers, including that all cameras be removed. When they were not, he refused to appear for game 2, giving Spassky a default win. His appeal was rejected. Karpov speculates that this forfeited game was actually a masterstroke on Fischer's part, a move designed specifically to upset Spassky's equanimity.

With the score now 2–0 in Spassky's favor, many observers believed that the match was over and Fischer would leave Iceland, and, indeed, Fischer looked to board the next plane out, only to be dissuaded by his second, William Lombardy. His decision to stay in the match was attributed by some to another phone call from Kissinger and a deluge of cablegrams. Sportingly, Spassky agreed to play the third game in a small room backstage, out of sight of the spectators. According to Pal Benko and Burt Hochberg, this concession was a psychological mistake by Spassky.

Game 3: Spassky–Fischer, 0–1 (Modern Benoni) 

July 16. This game proved to be the turning point of the match. After 11.Qc2, Fischer demonstrated his understanding of the position with 11...Nh5—a seemingly  move allowing White to shatter Black's  pawn structure, but Fischer's assessment that his kingside  created significant  proved correct. Surprised by Fischer's , Spassky did not react in the best way. Instead of 15.Bd2, 15.Ne2!? was possible (Zaitsev), or 15.f3 to prevent ...Ng4. In particular, Spassky's 18th move, weakening the light squares, was a mistake.

Game 4: Fischer–Spassky, ½–½ (Sicilian Sozin) 

July 18. The match resumed with this game on the main hall stage per Spassky's request, but without TV cameras per Fischer's request. 
  
Fischer as White played the Sozin Attack against Spassky's Sicilian Defense. Spassky sacrificed a pawn, and after 17...Bxc5+ had a slight advantage (Nunn). Spassky developed a strong kingside attack, but failed to convert it into a win, the game ending in a draw.

Game 5: Spassky–Fischer, 0–1 (Nimzo-Indian) 

July 20. Game 5 was another Nimzo-Indian, this time the Hübner Variation: 4.Nf3 c5 5.e3 Nc6 6.Bd3 Bxc3+ 7.bxc3 d6. Fischer rebuffed Spassky's attempt to attack; after 15...0-0 the game was even (Adorján). Fischer obtained a blocked position where Spassky was saddled with weak pawns and his  had no prospects. After 26 moves, Spassky blundered with 27.Qc2, and resigned after Fischer's 27...Bxa4!, as shown. After 28.Qxa4 Qxe4, Black's dual threats of 29...Qxg2 and 29...Qxe1# would decide; alternatively, 28.Qd2 (or 28.Qb1) Bxd1 29.Qxd1 Qxe4 30.Qd2 a4 wins. 
 
Thus Fischer had drawn level (the score was now 2½–2½), although FIDE rules stipulated that the champion retained the title if after 24 games the match ended in a tie.

After game 5, Fischer hinted to Lombardy about a surprise he had in store for game 6.

Game 6: Fischer–Spassky, 1–0 (QGD Tartakower) 

July 23. Before the match began, the Soviet team that had been training Spassky debated about whether Fischer might play an opening move different from his usual 1.e4. "But when the question was raised as to whether 1.d4 or 1.c4 could be expected of Fischer, Spassky replied: 'Let's not bother with such nonsense – I'll play the Tartakower [Defence]. What can he achieve?...

Fischer played 1.c4 (instead of 1.e4) for only the third time in a serious game. With 3.d4 the game transposed to the Queen's Gambit Declined, surprising many who had never seen Fischer play the White side of that opening. In fact, he had previously openly condemned it.

Spassky played Tartakower's Defense (7...b6), his favorite choice in many tournaments and a line with which he had never lost. After 14.Bb5 (introduced in Furman–Geller, Moscow 1970), Spassky responded with 14...a6. Geller had previously shown Spassky 14...Qb7, the move with which Geller later beat Jan Timman at Hilversum 1973, but Spassky apparently forgot about it.  Fischer's 20.e4! – "the key move of the game" – struck at Black's center and left Spassky with no good alternatives. After Spassky's 20...d4, "the pawns have no hope of further advance and the white bishop is unimpeded." After 21.f4, Fischer had the upper hand (Hort). After 26.f5, White had a crushing attack. 

After this game, Spassky joined the audience in applauding Fischer's win. This astounded Fischer, who called his opponent "a true sportsman".

"Lombardy was ecstatic: 'Bobby has played a steady, fluent game, and just watched Spassky make horrendous moves. Spassky has not met a player of Bobby's genius and caliber before, who fights for every piece on the board; he doesn't give in and agree to draws like the Russian grandmasters. This is a shock to Spassky.

According to C.H.O'D. Alexander: "This game was notable for two things. First, Fischer played the Queen's Gambit for the first time in his life in a serious game; second, he played it to perfection, the game indeed casting doubt on Black's whole opening system."

The win gave Fischer the lead (3½–2½) for the first time in the match.

Game 7: Spassky–Fischer, ½–½ (Sicilian Najdorf) 

July 25. Spassky played 1.e4 for the first time in the match. Fischer defended aggressively with his favorite Poisoned Pawn Variation of the Najdorf Sicilian, and after 17...Nc6 had the upper hand (Gipslis). He consolidated his extra pawn and reached a winning endgame, but then played carelessly, allowing Spassky to salvage a draw.

Game 8: Fischer–Spassky, 1–0 (English Symmetrical) 

July 27. Fischer again played 1.c4; the game remained an English Opening rather than transposing to another opening as in game 6. After 14...a6 the game was even. Spassky gave up an exchange with 15...b5 for little compensation in the way of a positional advantage. It is unclear whether Spassky's 15th move was a sacrifice or a blunder, but his 19th move was definitely a blunder that lost a pawn and left him with a hopeless position. Fischer won, putting him ahead 5–3.

Game 9: Spassky–Fischer, ½–½ (QGD Semi-Tarrasch) 

August 1. The game was delayed when Spassky took time off for illness. The opening was the Semi-Tarrasch Defense of the Queen's Gambit Declined. After 13...0-0 the game was even (Parma), and the game ended in a quiet draw after just 29 moves.

Game 10: Fischer–Spassky, 1–0 (Ruy Lopez Breyer) 

August 3. Fischer played the Ruy Lopez, an opening on which he was a great expert. After 25...Qxa5 (25...axb5 26.Rxb5 Ba6 gives Spassky a better chance; Gligorić), Fischer obtained the upper hand by initiating a dangerous attack on Spassky's king with 26.Bb3 (Matanović), suddenly placing Black in a critical situation. Spassky sacrificed the exchange for a pawn, reaching a sharp endgame where his two connected passed pawns gave almost sufficient compensation for Fischer's small  advantage. Spassky had drawing chances, but played inexactly, and Fischer won the game with precise play.

Game 11: Spassky–Fischer, 1–0 (Sicilian Najdorf) 

August 6. This game was a dramatic win for Spassky, his first since games 1 and 2. As in game 7, Fischer essayed his favorite Poisoned Pawn Variation; Spassky surprised him with the startling 14.Nb1 (given  by many annotators at the time), retreating the knight to its starting position. Although later analysis showed that the move was only sufficient for  if Black responded correctly, Fischer did not. If 15...Ne7 by Black then 16.N1d2!? and the game is unclear (Gipslis). After inferior defense by Fischer, Spassky trapped Fischer's queen and handed him his only defeat ever as Black in the Poisoned Pawn.

Game 12: Fischer–Spassky, ½–½ (QGD Orthodox) 

August 8. A quiet Queen's Gambit Declined. After 19.Be4, Fischer had a slight advantage (Yudovich), and after 24...a5 the game was even (Polugaevsky). The game ended in an opposite-colored bishops endgame draw after 55 moves.

Game 13: Spassky–Fischer, 0–1 (Alekhine's Defense) 
August 10. Fischer avoided the Sicilian Defense, with which he had lost game 11, opting for Alekhine's Defense. After 8...a5 9.a4 (9.c3 and Black is only slightly better; Gligorić) dxe5 10.dxe5 Na6! 11.0-0 Nc5, Fischer had the upper hand (Bagirov). The game swung one way, then another, and was finally adjourned at move 42 with Fischer having an edge in a sharp position but no clear win. The Soviet team's analysis convinced them that the position was drawn. Fischer stayed up until 8 a.m. analyzing it (the resumption being at 2:30 p.m.). He had not found a win either, but managed to win a complicated pawns-versus-rook endgame after Spassky missed a relatively simple draw with 69.Rc3+. Spassky's seconds were stunned, and Spassky himself refused to leave the board for a long time after the game was over, unable to believe the result. He remarked, "It is very strange. How can one lose with the opponent's only rook locked in completely at g8?"

Lombardy noted the shock that Spassky was in after he resigned:While Fischer dashed for his car, Spassky remained glued to his seat. A sympathetic Lothar Schmid came over, and the two shifted the pieces about with Boris demonstrating his careless mistakes. The two were left wondering how Bobby could have squeezed a win from a position which a night of competent analysis by a renowned Soviet team had showed to be a guaranteed draw.

Former World Champion Mikhail Botvinnik said this game made a particularly strong impression on him. He called it "the highest creative achievement of Fischer".  He resolved a  opposite-colored bishops endgame by sacrificing his bishop and trapping his own rook. "Then five passed pawns struggled with the white rook. Nothing similar had been seen before in chess".

David Bronstein said, "Of all the games from the match, the 13th appeals to me most of all. When I play through the game I still cannot grasp the innermost motive behind this or that plan or even individual move.  Like an enigma, it still teases my imagination." 

When Spassky and Fischer shook hands, many in the audience thought they had agreed to a draw, thinking that 75.Rf4 draws. But 75...Rxd4! 76.Rxd4 Ke2 wins; 75.Be5 Rd1 76.Kxb3 Re1 also wins for Black.

The next seven games (games 14 through 20) were drawn. Fischer was unable to get the initiative. Spassky chose lines that Fischer was unable to break. With a three-point lead, Fischer was content to inch towards the title, and Spassky seemed resigned to his fate.

The off-the-board antics continued, including a lawsuit against Fischer for damages by Chester Fox, who had filming rights to the match (Fischer had objected to what he said were noticeable camera noises, and the Icelandic hosts had reluctantly – they were to share in film revenues along with the two contestants – removed the television cameras), a Fischer demand to remove the first seven rows of spectators (eventually, three rows were cleared), and Soviet claims that Fischer was using electronic and chemical devices to 'control' Spassky, resulting in an Icelandic police sweep of the hall.

Game 14: Fischer–Spassky, ½–½ (QGD Harrwitz) 

August 15. The game was postponed at Spassky's request. Fischer was again White in a Queen's Gambit Declined. After 18.Be5 (18.Nxb6 Qxb6 19.Be5 and Fischer keeps a slight advantage; Gligorić) Bxa4 19.Qxa4 Nc6! Spassky had the upper hand (Karpov). Fischer blundered a pawn on move 21. Spassky blundered it back on move 27, however, and the game settled into a 40-move draw.

Game 15: Spassky–Fischer, ½–½ (Sicilian Najdorf) 

August 17. Fischer returned to the Najdorf Sicilian, but played the main line rather than the Poisoned Pawn Variation with which he had lost game 11. After 19.c3, Spassky had the upper hand (Gipslis). After 28...Rd7 the game was even, but when Spassky took a second pawn with 29.Qxh5 it allowed Fischer a very strong attack. Spassky, on the brink of disaster, "found miraculous replies while in time pressure" and Fischer was only able to achieve a draw by threefold repetition after 43 moves. Two years later, Yugoslav grandmaster Dragoljub Velimirović improved on Spassky's play with the piece sacrifice 13.Bxb5, winning a crushing victory in Velimirović–Al Kazzaz, Nice Olympiad 1974. Black in turn later improved on Fischer's 12...0-0-0 with 12...b4.

Game 16: Fischer–Spassky, ½–½ (Ruy Lopez Exchange) 

August 20. Fischer played the Exchange Variation of the Ruy Lopez, a favorite line of his. After 17...Rfe8 the game was equal (Gipslis). Spassky defended well, and after a tactical flurry in the endgame, ended up with the nominal advantage of an extra pawn in a rook ending known to be an easy . Although a draw could have been agreed after move 34, Spassky "used his symbolic  advantage for a little psychological torture", prolonging the game until move 60 before agreeing to a draw.

Game 17: Spassky–Fischer, ½–½ (Pirc Defense) 

August 22. Fischer played the Pirc Defense for the first time in his career. After 18...Qc7 the game was unclear (Parma). The game ended in a draw by the threefold repetition rule.

Game 18: Fischer–Spassky, ½–½ (Sicilian Rauzer) 

August 24. The game opened with a Richter–Rauzer Attack. After 19...Ne5 the game was equal (Matanović, Ugrinović). Like game 17, the game ended in a draw by threefold repetition.

Game 19: Spassky–Fischer, ½–½ (Alekhine's Defense) 

August 27. The second Alekhine's Defense of the match, the game ended in a draw after 40 moves. After 18...Bg5, Gligorić commented "a queer situation has arisen with many tactical possibilities for both sides." After 19.Bh5 the position was unclear (Bagirov). After 37...a6, C.H.O'D. Alexander wrote: "A miracle; after all the excitements – two piece sacrifices by White and the counter-sacrifice of a rook by Black – the players have reached a completely equal endgame with no chances for either side."

Game 20: Fischer–Spassky, ½–½ (Sicilian Rauzer) 

August 29. Another Richter–Rauzer, after 13...Nxd2 the game was equal (Matanović, Ugrinović). Spassky outplayed Fischer and got a better position. Fischer headed for a  endgame but Spassky twice avoided a draw by threefold repetition. After 54 moves, Fischer made an incorrect claim of threefold repetition, but Spassky agreed to a draw anyway.

Game 21: Spassky–Fischer, 0–1 (Sicilian Taimanov) 

August 31. The 21st game proved to be the last of the match. After 14...Qxf6 the game was equal (Taimanov). Spassky played badly in the endgame, and the game was adjourned with a big advantage for Fischer. Fischer's 40th move  was not the best, however; he should have played 40...Kg4 before ...h5 (his actual 40th move). Had Spassky  41.Kh3! (preventing ...Kg4), he would have had drawing chances. Instead he sealed 41.Bd7, which would have permitted Black to win with 41...Kg4 followed by  his h-pawn. On September 1, the day scheduled for resumption of the game, arbiter Lothar Schmid informed Fischer and the audience that Spassky had resigned the game by telephone, making Fischer the winner of the match. FIDE President Max Euwe expressed disappointment that Spassky did not go to the playing hall to congratulate Fischer. 

The final score was 12½–8½ in favor of Fischer, making him the eleventh world champion.  Spassky won three games (including the forfeit in game 2), Fischer won seven games, and there were eleven draws.

Aftermath
Fischer's crushing victory made him an instant celebrity. Upon his return to New York, a Bobby Fischer Day was held. He was offered numerous product endorsement offers worth millions of dollars, all of which he declined. He appeared on the cover of Sports Illustrated with American Olympic swimming champion Mark Spitz. Fischer also made television appearances on a Bob Hope special and The Tonight Show starring Johnny Carson. But the games in this match proved to be his last public competitive games for two decades. Fischer had, prior to the match, felt that the first-to-12½-points format was not fair, since it encouraged whoever was leading to play for draws instead of wins. He himself adopted this strategy in the match: after having taken a comfortable lead, he drew games 14–20. With each game, he coasted closer to the title, while Spassky lost a chance to fight back. 

This style of chess offended Fischer. Instead he demanded the format be changed to that used in the very first World Chess Championship, between Wilhelm Steinitz and Johannes Zukertort, where the winner was the first player to score 10 wins, with draws not counting. In case of a 9–9 score, the champion would retain title, and the prize fund split equally. A FIDE Congress was held in 1974 during the Nice Olympiad. The delegates voted in favor of Fischer's 10-win proposal, but rejected the 9–9 clause as well as the possibility of an unlimited match. In response, Fischer refused to defend his title. Anatoly Karpov, who had fought his way through the 1975 candidates tournament, was declared World Champion by forfeit.

Seventeen years later, Fischer entered negotiations with sponsors willing to fund a match under his proposed format, settling on a bid from Yugoslav millionaire Jezdimir Vasiljević. Fischer insisted that since he had not been defeated in a match, he was still the true world champion. He further claimed that all the games in the FIDE-sanctioned World Championship matches, involving Karpov and his challengers Korchnoi and Kasparov, had prearranged outcomes. He then challenged Spassky (tied for 96th–102nd on the FIDE rating list at the time) to a rematch, leading to the 1992 Fischer–Spassky match.

In popular culture
 The musical Chess, with lyrics by Tim Rice and music by Björn Ulvaeus and Benny Andersson, tells the story of two chess champions, referred to only as "The American" and "The Russian". The musical is loosely based on the 1972 World Championship match between Fischer and Spassky.
 During the 1972 Fischer–Spassky match, the Soviet bard Vladimir Vysotsky wrote an ironic two-song cycle "Honor of the Chess Crown". The first song is about a rank-and-file Soviet worker's preparation for the match with Fischer; the second is about the game. Many expressions from the songs have become catchphrases in Russian culture.
 The 2011 documentary Bobby Fischer Against the World features extensive archival footage from the match.
 The 2014 film Pawn Sacrifice tells the story of Fischer's attempts to defeat Russian Boris Spassky and become the world champion. The film is directed by Edward Zwick and stars Tobey Maguire as Fischer and Liev Schreiber as Spassky.
 In the sixth episode of season 3 of Drunk History, comedian Rich Fulcher recounts the 1972 World Championship match between Fischer and Spassky.

See also
 Fischer–Spassky (1992 match)

Notes

References

 Cited throughout the article as Chess Informant 14.

External links
 Match games in PGN format, and a javascript interface
 Match games available with a PGN chessviewer on Internet on the Chessgames.com website
 Brief comments by Bobby Fischer on the upcoming 1972 Match video clip
 Fischer vs Spassky Documentary BBC documentary
 Spassky vs. Fischer 1972, video clips with expert commentary: Game 3, Game 5, Game 6, Game 8, Game 10, Game 11, Game 13
 “Spassky v Fischer, Reykjavik, 1972” by Edward Winter
 Why The Match Of The Century Almost Didn't Happen. - by Peter Doggers

1972
1972 in chess
Chess in Iceland
1972 in Icelandic sport
Sports competitions in Reykjavík
Soviet Union–United States relations
1970s in Reykjavík
Politics and sports
Bobby Fischer
July 1972 sports events in Europe
August 1972 sports events in Europe